Ladbroke Hall is an 18th-century country house, now converted into residential apartments, situated at Ladbroke, near Southam, Warwickshire, England. It is a Grade II listed building.

The Ladbroke estate was the home of the Palmer family having been purchased by William Palmer in 1633. The present house was built in a Georgian style in the 18th century. It was designed to an H-shaped plan, the entrance frontage being two storeyed with gabled attics, and seven bays, the three central bays recessed.

In 1825, a later William Palmer of Ladbroke inherited the Derbyshire estate of his aunt Helen Morewood at Alfreton Hall and took the surname Palmer-Morewood. His grandson Charles Rowland Palmer-Morewood was High Sheriff of Derbyshire in 1871 and of Warwickshire in 1880. The 1881 British Census discloses his residence on the  estate with a retinue of thirteen servants. Ladbroke's gambling company was founded by Messrs. Schwind and Pennington in 1886, as commission agents for horses trained at the hall. The name Ladbrokes was adopted in 1902, when Arthur Bendir joined the partnership, and operations were moved to London.

References
 
  A History of the County of Warwick Vol 6 (1951) pp.143–147, [http://www.british-history.ac.uk/ British History Online, UK.

Grade II listed buildings in Warwickshire
Country houses in Warwickshire